The Airport Museum is located inside the Melbourne International Airport, One Air Terminal Parkway, Melbourne, Florida. It houses displays of the history of the Naval Air Station Melbourne and the Melbourne International Airport. It also contains a Link Trainer and aviation artwork.

Gallery

References

Aerospace museums in Florida
Buildings and structures in Melbourne, Florida
Museums in Brevard County, Florida